Robert Edmund Pender (1867 – July 16, 1936) held multiple roles in professional baseball. He played, managed and umpired at the minor league level for many years.

His playing career began in 1886 and lasted through 1907. Records indicate that Pender, who played multiple positions including third base, first base and even pitcher, did not play in 1891 and 1902. His statistical record is incomplete, however it is known that in 1896, with the Richmond Bluebirds of the Virginia League, he hit .312 with 56 stolen bases and in 1901, with the Selma Christians of the Southern Association, he hit .303 in 104 games. He played in the Interstate League in 1898 and 1899 and was called "the best third baseman [the Interstate League] has ever had," by the Youngstown Vindicator.

As a manager, he led the Petersburg Farmers (1895), Selma Christians (1901), Baton Rouge Cajuns (1902), Baton Rouge Red Sticks (1903-1904), Charleston Sea Gulls (1906) and Norfolk Tars (1907-1909). He led the Red Sticks to a league championship in 1903 and the Tars to a league championship in 1907.

He then became an umpire in the Virginia League  and New York State League.  In April 1909, he was chased by an angry mob after it was claimed he was intentionally trying to throw a game. He took refuge in the Roanoke jail.

College coaching
He was the head baseball coach at Louisiana State University in 1912 and 1913. He compiled a record of 15–17 in his two seasons as head coach.

Personal life
He was born in Louisiana and died on July 16, 1936.

References

External links
 
 Early Professional Baseball in Hampton Roads: A History, 1884-1928

1936 deaths
Baseball first basemen
Baseball second basemen
Baseball third basemen
Minor league baseball managers
Minor league baseball umpires
Albany Senators players
Baton Rouge Red Sticks players
Birmingham Grays players
Charleston Seagulls players
Davenport Hawkeyes players
Galveston Sand Crabs players
Houston Buffaloes players
Jacksonville Jays players
Lead City Grays players
LSU Tigers baseball coaches
Mobile Bluebirds players
Norfolk Tars players
Ottumwa Giants players
Petersburg Farmers players
Richmond Bluebirds players
Robert E. Lee's players
San Antonio Missionaries players
Selma Christians players
Schenectady Electricians players
Youngstown Little Giants players
Youngstown Puddlers players
1867 births